Shrine '69 is a live album by British blues rock band Fleetwood Mac, recorded on 25 January 1969, and finally released in 1999. Recorded at a concert in Los Angeles, this album includes versions of the band's recent hits, "Albatross" and "Need Your Love So Bad", as well as more unusual songs like "Before the Beginning" and "Lemon Squeezer".

Track listing
"Tune Up" – 2:10
"If You Be My Baby" (Peter Green, C.G. Adams) – 4:28
"Something Inside of Me" (Danny Kirwan) – 4:03
"My Sweet Baby" (Homesick James) – 4:26
"Albatross" (Green) – 3:26
"Before the Beginning" (Green) – 3:05
"Rollin' Man" (Green, Adams) – 5:33
"Lemon Squeezer" (James A. Lane) – 5:29
"Need Your Love So Bad" (Little Willie John, Mertis John Jr.) – 6:59
"Great Balls of Fire" (Otis Blackwell, Jack Hammer) – 3:37

Personnel
Fleetwood Mac
Peter Green – guitar, vocals
Jeremy Spencer – guitar, vocals, piano
Danny Kirwan – guitar, vocals
John McVie – bass guitar
Mick Fleetwood – drums, percussion
Technical
Dinky Dawson – sound engineer
Alan Douches – mastering engineer
Clifford Davis – management

Notes

Fleetwood Mac live albums
1999 live albums
Rykodisc live albums